The knockout phase of the 2013–14 UEFA Champions League began on 18 February and concluded on 24 May 2014 with the final at Estádio da Luz in Lisbon, Portugal. A total of 16 teams competed in the knockout phase.

Times are CET/CEST, as listed by UEFA (local times are in parentheses).

Round and draw dates
All draws were held at UEFA headquarters in Nyon, Switzerland.

Format
The knockout phase involved the 16 teams which qualified as winners and runners-up of each of the eight groups in the group stage.

Each tie in the knockout phase, apart from the final, was played over two legs, with each team playing one leg at home. The team that scored more goals on aggregate over the two legs advanced to the next round. If the aggregate score was level, the away goals rule was applied, i.e., the team that scored more goals away from home over the two legs advanced. If away goals were also equal, then 30 minutes of extra time was played. The away goals rule was again applied after extra time, i.e., if there were goals scored during extra time and the aggregate score was still level, the visiting team advanced by virtue of more away goals scored. If no goals were scored during extra time, the tie was decided by penalty shoot-out. In the final, which was played as a single match, if scores were level at the end of normal time, extra time was played, followed by penalty shoot-out if scores remained tied.

The mechanism of the draws for each round was as follows:
In the draw for the round of 16, the eight group winners were seeded, and the eight group runners-up were unseeded. The seeded teams were drawn against the unseeded teams, with the seeded teams hosting the second leg. Teams from the same group or the same association could not be drawn against each other.
In the draws for the quarter-finals onwards, there were no seedings, and teams from the same group or the same association could be drawn against each other.

Qualified teams

Bracket

Round of 16
The draw was held on 16 December 2013. The first legs were played on 18, 19, 25 and 26 February, and the second legs were played on 11, 12, 18 and 19 March 2014.

|}

Matches

Barcelona won 4–1 on aggregate.

Manchester United won 3–2 on aggregate.

Atlético Madrid won 5–1 on aggregate.

Paris Saint-Germain won 6–1 on aggregate.

Chelsea won 3–1 on aggregate.

Real Madrid won 9–2 on aggregate.

Borussia Dortmund won 5–4 on aggregate.

Bayern Munich won 3–1 on aggregate.

Quarter-finals
The draw was held on 21 March 2014. The first legs were played on 1 and 2 April, and the second legs were played on 8 and 9 April 2014.

|}

Matches

Atlético Madrid won 2–1 on aggregate.

Real Madrid won 3–2 on aggregate.

3–3 on aggregate; Chelsea won on away goals.

Bayern Munich won 4–2 on aggregate.

Semi-finals
The draw was held on 11 April 2014. The first legs were played on 22 and 23 April, and the second legs were played on 29 and 30 April 2014.

|}

Matches

Real Madrid won 5–0 on aggregate.

Atlético Madrid won 3–1 on aggregate.

Final

Notes

References

External links
2013–14 UEFA Champions League

Knockout Phase
2013-14